Platymantis bimaculatus is a species of frog in the family Ceratobatrachidae.
It is endemic to West Papua, Indonesia.

Its natural habitat is subtropical or tropical moist lowland forests.
It is threatened by habitat loss.

Geographical Range 
This species is known only from the type locality in the Wondiwoi Mountains, Papua, Indonesia, from 400-800m above sea level. It probably occurs more widely.

Habitat and Ecology 
It inhabits primary rainforest and breeds by direct development. The males call from the forest floor, and its eggs are also laid on the ground.

References

Sources
 

bimaculatus
Amphibians of Western New Guinea
Endemic fauna of Indonesia
Taxonomy articles created by Polbot
Amphibians described in 1999
Taxobox binomials not recognized by IUCN